Haim Megrelashvili (born July 4, 1982 in Tirat Carmel) is a retired Israeli football defender who most of his career played for Hapoel Haifa. He joined Maccabi Haifa in 2003 from cross-town rival Hapoel Haifa, and within a short time became Israel's rookie of the year. Haim is also known for his attacking skills, often joining attacks from the wings.

He is of Georgian Jewish ancestry and his surname literally means "son of Megrelia" in Georgian. Due to its complexity, his surname is almost always misspelled as "Magrashvili" instead.

Career
Haim started his footballing career at Maccabi Haifa, as a schoolboy before giving up football altogether and concentrating on athletics and gymnastics. His brother, Akiva, continued playing football and joined Hapoel Kiryat Shmona. During Haim's first season at Maccabi Haifa he managed to start a total of twenty-six matches. His second season at Haifa was far from a progression as he managed to start a mere seven games. Ronny Levy would give Megrelashvili more opportunities in the 2006/07 season and Haim played an integral part of the squads progression to the round of sixteen in the UEFA Cup. His European performance as well as domestic performance caused him to garner interest from Dutch club Vitesse Arnhem. He joined the Eredivisie side for the 2007–08 season, signing a deal until 2010. His contract was terminated by the club in August 2009. Megrelashvili was without a club until January 2010 when he signed for Maccabi Petah Tikva.

On March 15, 2008, in the match against FC Twente, Megrelishvili was substituted after only 6 minutes into the game, after a number of defensive errors. Two weeks later, in the match against AZ, Megrelishvili was replaced 
after 16 minutes. On June 6, 2011, Megrelishvili signed In Maccabi Haifa For Two Years.

Honours
Maccabi Haifa
Israeli Premier League (2): 2004–05, 2005–06
Toto Cup Al (1):2005–06

Maccabi Tel Aviv
Toto Cup Al (1): 2008–09

Hapoel Haifa
Israel State Cup (1): 2017–18

References

External links
Official
  Profile and biography of Haim Megrelashvili on Maccabi Haifa's official website

Unofficial
  IFA Profile
  Profile and statistics of Haim Megrelashvili on One.co.il
  Profile and statistics of Haim Megrelashvili on Maccabi Haifa Online

1982 births
Israeli Jews
Living people
Israeli footballers
Hapoel Haifa F.C. players
Maccabi Haifa F.C. players
Maccabi Tel Aviv F.C. players
Maccabi Petah Tikva F.C. players
Alki Larnaca FC players
SBV Vitesse players
Beitar Jerusalem F.C. players
AEK Larnaca FC players
Liga Leumit players
Israeli Premier League players
Eredivisie players
Cypriot First Division players
Israeli expatriate footballers
Expatriate footballers in the Netherlands
Expatriate footballers in Cyprus
Israeli expatriate sportspeople in the Netherlands
Israeli expatriate sportspeople in Cyprus
Israeli people of Georgian-Jewish descent
Footballers from Tirat Carmel
Association football defenders